Nupserha minor is a species of beetle in the family Cerambycidae. It was described by Maurice Pic in 1939. It contains the varietas Nupserha minor var. chinensis.

References

minor
Beetles described in 1939